Mitt Elf Isem Ieħor: HappyVeganGirlJules (English: A Hundred Thousand Other Names: HappyVeganGirlJules) is a 2021 young adult novel written by the Maltese author Lon Kirkop. This debut novel won the 2020 edition of The Literary Contest of Novels for Youth organised by the Malta National Book Council and Aġenzija Żagħżagħ. The novel novel become an instant success and was one of the hits during the Malta Book Festival 2021.

Plot 
The story follows Manda and Julia/Jules, two Maltese teens. Julia is a famous Maltese influencer, mainly famous for her YouTube channel Happy Vegan Girl Jules where she mainly upload content related to veganism. Manda is Jules number one fan. She copies everything that Jules does on her YouTube channel trying to compensate for the far from idilic life she has at home. This quickly leads to obsession and Manda's identity crisis.

Written with teenangers in mind, the novel tackles their fears, behaviours and relationships both within their social circle and online. It does not only speak their language when it comes to the writing style, but also the way the novel takes the form of social media posts, WhatsApp messages, YouTube videos and Vlogs.

Visuals 
Kirkop worked with the Maltese artist Pierre Portelli on the visuals for the book. Together, they created a hybrid between the traditional book and social media feeds. The layout and the cover was done by Pierre Portelli while all the illustrations were done by Lon Kirkop.

Awards 
Mitt Elf Isem Ieħor: HappyVeganGirlJules (English: A Hundred Thousand Other Names: HappyVeganGirlJules) won The Literary Contest of Novels for Youth 2020, organised by the Malta National Book Council and Aġenzija Żagħżagħ.

Reception 
The novel novel become an instant success and was one of the hits during the Malta Book Festival 2021, with Critics and reading praising it for its fresh voices, pacing and provocative content.

Kimberly, A book blogger/bookstagrammer and a teacher, from OnceUponaMalteseReader, wrote:"...it is a story that I can see a lot of students in it. As a teacher I can recognise the validity of the story and how faithful it is to real life."
Robert Pisani, in a review about the book on the Bobsphere, wrote:"With Mitt Elf Isem Ieħor, Lon Kirkop gives the reader a glimpse of internet behaviour. Not only the falsity of the influencer’s world but also how teens use social media as an escape or to bully: one scene involves Manda being harassed through Instagram and Messenger, another one scene focuses on the nasty comments Jules receives from trolls on her channel.

The book was featured in some notable Maltese language news portals such as one.com.mt and Strada Rjali.

References 

Maltese-language books
2021 debut novels
Young adult novels
Award-winning novels